Coppage is a surname. Notable people with the surname include:

Al Coppage (1916–1992), American football player
Terrence R. Coppage (1953–2014), American blogger
Walter Coppage, American actor

See also 
Coppage v. Kansas, a US Supreme Court case based on US labor law